Uttara West Thana is a thana of Bangladesh situated in Sector 11 of Uttara, Dhaka.

This thana was established in 4 September 2012 to decrease the responsibility of former Uttara Thana (present name Uttara East Thana).

This thana is formed by Abdullahpur, Bawnia, Kamarpara, Batulia, Roashdia and Sector 3, 5, 7, 9, 10, 11, 12, 13, 14 of the town.

See also
 List of districts and suburbs of Dhaka

References

External links 
 Dhaka Metropolitan Police - Find Your Local Police
 Bangladesh Police - Metropolitan Police

Thanas of Uttara
2012 establishments in Bangladesh